Belinda Phillips (born 4 September 1958) is a Jamaican former swimmer. She competed in three events at the 1972 Summer Olympics.

References

External links
 

1958 births
Living people
Jamaican female swimmers
Olympic swimmers of Jamaica
Swimmers at the 1972 Summer Olympics
Place of birth missing (living people)